Maryna Zanevska was the defending champion, but lost to Nao Hibino in the second round.

Misaki Doi won the title after defeating Heather Watson 6–7(4–7), 6–1, 6–4 in the final.

Seeds

Draw

Finals

Top half

Bottom half

References
Main Draw

Odlum Brown Vancouver Open - Singles
Vancouver Open